Spider-Man 3 is a 2007 American superhero film and the final part of Sam Raimi's Spider-Man trilogy.

Spider-Man 3 may also refer to:

 Spider-Man 3 (video game), the video game based on the 2007 film
 Spider-Man 3 (soundtrack), the soundtrack of the 2007 film

See also

 List of Spider-Man titles

 Spider-Man in film
 Spider-Man 2 (disambiguation)
 Spider-Man (disambiguation)

Spider-Man